London Sounds Eastern was one of the most popular ethnic minority radio programs on the BBC. It was presented by Vernon Corea and produced by Keith Yeomans.

The Launching of London Sounds Eastern -BBC Radio London
The program went on the airwaves on a Sunday evening on BBC Radio London. It enjoyed a huge multi-cultural radio audience and was even highlighted in the BBC Radio Times in 1976. London Sounds Eastern created broadcasting history in the United Kingdom: it was the first ever Asian programme in English, on the BBC. Until the launch of 'London Sounds Eastern,' Asian radio programmes in the United Kingdom were mostly in the Hindi and Urdu languages and the programme replaced two 30-minute shows which had been broadcast in the Bengali, Hindi and Urdu languages.

Ethnic Minority Broadcasting on the BBC
'London Sounds Eastern' was a real breakthrough in terms of ethnic minority broadcasting. It expanded musical horizons featuring music as diverse as the ghazals of Pakistan, raagas from India and baila from Sri Lanka. It even featured music from China and Singapore.

Vernon Corea, presenter of London Sounds Eastern was appointed Asian Programmes Officer of the BBC and trained broadcasters from minority ethnic communities for the BBC Local Radio network. Among those who sought advice on a career in radio was the BBC TV Presenter George Alagiah. Vernon Corea went on to be the BBC's Ethnic Minorities Adviser.

South Asian Stars on the BBC
A whole host of Asian stars were featured - Lata Mangeshkar, Asha Bhosle, Usha Uthup, Ravi Shankar, Pandith Amaradeva, Asian actress Jamila Massey and her husband the writer Reginald Massey, Clarence Wijewardene, Annesley Malewana, Mignonne Fernando, Nimal Mendis, The Gypsies, Desmond de Silva were some of the South Asian stars on 'London Sounds Eastern.' Their music reached new audiences in London and hundreds of fans wrote in to BBC Radio London. Vernon Corea featured the different sounds of the Indian sub-continent, from ragaas to contemporary baila.

South Asian Heads of State on the programme
Heads of State have also appeared on the radio programme among them the President of Sri Lanka. Vernon Corea, the presenter of 'London Sounds Eastern' also met with the President of the Maldives when he was invited to the islands to train Maldivian broadcasters at Radio Maldives.

BBC Asian Network
The programme pioneered the way for the BBC Asian Network. Ravi Shankar was among the celebrities interviewed by Vernon Corea for London Sounds Eastern.

Listen to the BBC Radio London Jingles from the 1970s - 1980s:
John Allen's BBC Radio London 206 Pages

See also
BBC London 94.9
Vernon Corea

External links
BBC London 94.9
Media UK - BBC London 94.9
BBC Radio London
View 550 photos of BBC Radio London 206 in the 1970s and 80s

BBC Local Radio programmes
BBC Radio London programmes
1976 radio programme debuts
1985 radio programme endings
Mass media in London